This article features the 1995 UEFA European Under-18 Championship qualifying stage. Matches were played 1994 through 1995. Two qualifying rounds were organised and seven teams qualified for the main tournament, joining host Greece.

Round 1

Group 1
All matches were played in Germany.

Group 2

Group 3

Group 4

|}

Group 5
All matches were played in Malta.

Group 6
All matches were played in Turkey.

Group 7
All matches were played in Bulgaria.

Group 8
All matches were played in Ukraine.

Group 9
All matches were played in Slovakia.

Group 10
All matches were played in Austria.

Group 11

Group 12

Group 13
All matches were played in Italy.

Group 14
All matches were played in Norway.

Group 15
All matches were played in England

Round 2

Group 1
All matches were played in Spain.

Groups 2-7

|}

See also
 1995 UEFA European Under-18 Championship

External links
Results by RSSSF

UEFA European Under-19 Championship qualification
Qual